The Cicare CH-14 Aguilucho (Spanish for "Little Eagle" or "Harrier") is a light experimental helicopter manufactured by Cicaré Helicópteros of Argentina. The helicopter is intended for use in civil, security and military roles.

Design and development
In 2005, the Argentine Army Aviation commissioned Augusto Cicaré to build a light helicopter. The prototype was completed early in 2007, and the first flight occurred on 19 March 2007. The prototype made its public debut during "Army Aviation Day" on 23 November 2007.

Specifications (CH-14)

See also

References

External links

 "Argentina's Little Eagle takes flight", Flight International

Military helicopters
2000s Argentine military utility aircraft
2000s Argentine helicopters
CH-14
Single-turbine helicopters
Aircraft first flown in 2007